Baddeckenstedt is a municipality in the district of Wolfenbüttel, in Lower Saxony, Germany. It is situated in an exclave of the district, approx. 10 km southwest of Salzgitter, and 30 km southwest of Braunschweig.

Baddeckenstedt is also the seat of the Samtgemeinde ("collective municipality") Baddeckenstedt.

The municipality Baddeckenstedt consists of the following villages:
 Baddeckenstedt
 Binder
 Oelber am weißen Wege
 Rhene
 Wartjenstedt

References

Wolfenbüttel (district)